Camp Ridge is a prominent ridge surmounted by Mount Hayton in the southeast part of the East Quartzite Range, Concord Mountains, Victoria Land, Antarctica. The geographical feature was so named by the Northern Party of the New Zealand Federated Mountain Clubs Antarctic Expedition, 1962–63, after Camp IV which was established at this location. The ridge lies situated on the Pennell Coast, a portion of Antarctica lying between Cape Williams and Cape Adare.

References
 

Ridges of Victoria Land
Pennell Coast